Franklin Electric (NASDAQ:FELE) is a manufacturer and distributor of products and systems focused on the movement and management of water and fuel. The company offers pumps, motors, drives, and controls for use in a variety of residential, commercial, agricultural, industrial, and municipal applications. Headquartered in Fort Wayne, Indiana, the company also operates manufacturing facilities in the United States, Germany, Czech Republic, Italy, Turkey, Mexico, Brazil, Australia, South Africa, China, and Japan. As of 2020, the company employed 5,400 individuals worldwide.

History
Franklin Electric was founded in 1944 in Bluffton, Indiana, USA by E.J. (Ed) Schaefer and T.W. (Wayne) Kehoe. They named the company Franklin Electric in honor of Benjamin Franklin, whom they considered the country's first electrical engineer. The company's first product was a backpack generator to power the radio equipment paratroopers and other assault troops used during WWII.

When WWII concluded, Franklin experienced a reduction in orders. Schaefer and Kehoe began designing and manufacturing fractional horsepower motors to pump water into homes or out of flooded basements to adjust to the peacetime economy. This new product hit the market coinciding with the home building boom that occurred as G.I.s returned from war. The motors performed well and led to nearly $1.7 million in sales in 1947. In 1950, Franklin introduced the first electric motor that was fully submersible. The new pump motors were quiet, resistant to freezing, smaller, easy to install, and had a high pumping capacity. The new motors could recover water from much deeper in the earth, making it possible for the first time to develop areas with low water tables. The motors also proved extremely versatile. Eventually, they would be used for gasoline pumps, commercial air conditioning units, crude oil recovery, and deep-sea use. Another early Franklin success was the Submatic sump pump. The Submatic was sealed in a unique stainless-steel casing designed to automatically sense when water was rising and turn on the motor. With the Submatic, an external float switch was no longer needed, and the motor could be mounted out of sight beneath the floor level.

By the mid-60s, it was clear that Franklin motors could pump more than just water. The company began designing and producing motors to pump oil, as well as motors for undersea use. Eventually, Franklin developed a motor to move gasoline and founded FE Petro in 1988 (which would later be called Franklin Fueling Systems). Franklin would continue to expand its fueling and water businesses through acquisitions and organic growth throughout the years. In 2017, Franklin announced the acquisition of three distributors and formed Headwater Companies, LLC. Headwater has also continued to grow through acquisitions.

Primary Businesses

Global Water Systems 
Franklin offers pumps, motors, drives, and controls for use in a variety of residential, commercial, agricultural, industrial, and municipal installations, for both clean and grey water applications.

Acquisitions 

 JBD (Former pump line of Jacuzzi) – 2004
 Pioneer Pump – 2005
 Little Giant – 2006
 Denorco – 2007
 Monarch Industries – 2007
 Schneider Motobombas – 2008
 Western Pumps – 2008
 Vertical – 2009
 Impo – 2011
 Cerus – 2012
 Bombas Leão – 2014
 Pluga – 2014
 RotorPump – 2018
 Sterling / Avid – 2019
 CPS Pumps – 2020

Global Fueling Systems 

FE Petro introduced devices such as variable length pumps and the Mag Shell pump. Through acquisitions, Franklin Fueling Systems offers complete fueling systems.

Acquisitions 

 EBW, Inc – 2000
 APT, Inc – 2000
 INCON – 2002
 Phil-Tite Industries – 2005
 Healy – 2006
 PetroTechnik – 2010
 Flex-ing – 2012
 Wadcorpp – 2014
 Midtronics (Stationary Power Division) – 2018

Distribution 
Headwater Companies, LLC is a collection of groundwater distributors. They provide various products and brands to contractors within the USA.

Acquisitions 

 2M Company – 2017
 Western Hydro – 2017
 DSI – 2017
 2MDSI – 2017
 Valley Farm Supply – 2018
 Milan Supply Company – 2019
 Kokomo Pump Supply – 2019
 Gicon Pumps - 2021
 Blake Equipment - 2022

References

Pump manufacturers
Manufacturing companies based in Indiana
Companies based in Fort Wayne, Indiana
1944 establishments in Indiana
Manufacturing companies established in 1944
Companies listed on the Nasdaq